The Battle of Öland was a naval battle near the Swedish island of Öland.

History 
The engagement took place on September 11, 1563  between a fleet of allied Danish-Lübeck ships and a Swedish fleet of ships. Swedish naval force with 18 ships under the command of Jakob Bagge went out to meet the allied force  consisting of 27 Danish ships under Peder Skram and 6 from the Free City of Lübeck under the command of Friedrich Knebel.

See also
Battle of Öland (1789)

References

Other sources
Zettersten, Axel (1903) Svenska flottans historia aren 1635-1680 (Norrtelje : Norrtelje tidnings boktr)
 

Conflicts in 1563
Öland
Oland 1563
Oland (1563)
 Öland